The 20th Guards Motor Rifle Division is a formation of the Russian Ground Forces, originally formed within the Soviet Red Army as the 3rd Mechanised Corps. The division was reformed in 2021 from the former 20th Guards Motor Rifle Brigade.

The first formation of 1940 
The formation of the corps began in the Western Special Military District in June 1940 on the basis of headquarters and the relevant parts of the 24th Rifle Corps, 7th Cavalry Division, 21st Heavy Tank Brigade, 2nd Light Tank Brigade, 84th Rifle Division, and tank battalions of the 113th, 121st and 143rd rifle divisions.

The 3rd Mechanised Corps was first formed in July 1940, and on 22 June 1941, was stationed at Vilnius in the Baltic Military District under MG A.V. Kurkin. It consisted of 2nd Tank Division, 5th Tank Division, 84th Motorised Division, 15th Motorcycle Regiment, an artillery regiment, and engineer and signals battalions. On 22 June, the 2nd Tank Division was located in the forest in Gajzhuny, in the Ionava area, the 5th Tank Division was positioned to defend the Neman bridge near Alitus, and the 84th Motorised Division – was in forest in the Kajshadoris area. On 22 June 1941, the 3rd Mechanised Corps had 31,975 men & 651 tanks, of which 110 were new T-34 and KV-1 types.

The Corps was heavily engaged in the first battles of Operation Barbarossa, particularly during the Baltic Operation (1941) and at the Battle of Raseiniai.

On 24 June 1941, a single KV-2 heavy tank of 2nd Tank Division, at a crossroads in front of Raseiniai, managed to cut off elements of the 6th Panzer Division which had established bridgeheads on the Dubysa.  It stalled the Division's advance for a full day while being attacked by a variety of antitank weapons, until it finally ran out of ammunition. General Erhard Raus, the Officer commanding 6th Panzer Division's Kampfgruppe Raus, which was the unit held up by the lone vehicle, described the incident. Raus said that the vehicle was damaged by several shots from a 88mm anti-aircraft gun firing at the vehicle from behind whilst it was distracted by Panzer 35(t) tanks from Panzer Battalion 65. The crew were killed by grenades thrown by a Pioneer Engineer unit. The grenades were pushed through two holes made by the gun whilst the turret had started moving again, the other five or six shots having not apparently penetrated completely. The crew had remarkably only been apparently stunned by the shots which had entered the turret. Afterwards they were buried nearby with honours by the German soldiers of the unit held up.

However, by early July the Corps had virtually ceased to exist as a formation, though remnants rejoined Soviet lines later. For example, the 5th Tank Division was at Yelnya by 4 July 1941, and consisted of 2,552 men and a total of 2 BT-7 tanks and four armoured cars. The 2nd Tank Division was encircled and destroyed at Raseiniai and the 5th Tank Division was encircled and destroyed at the Battle of Białystok–Minsk and was disbanded shortly after.

On 11 July 1941 Col P Poluboiarov, Northwestern Front armoured directorate reported that the 3rd Mechanised Corps had 'completely perished' having only 400 men remaining who escaped encirclement with 2nd Tank Division & only 1 BT-7 tank.

The second formation of 1942 
The Corps was formed for the second time on 18 September 1942 at Kalinin in the Moscow Military District. Lieutenant General Mikhail Katukov took command. It was initially assigned to the 22nd Army of the Kalinin Front. It took part in Operation Mars alongside the 22nd Army. At the beginning of Operation Mars 3rd Mechanised Corps consisted of 232 tanks. Hamazasp Babadzhanian, who commanded the 3rd Mechanised Brigade of the corps, mentioned this operation briefly in his memoirs, quoting a conversation with 22nd Army commander, Vasily Yushkevich, who said, "We will conduct a rather serious offensive together with Western Front forces—we must liquidate the enemy Rzhev grouping".

The Corps then fought in the Battle of Kursk, then fought across the Ukraine with the Central, Belorussian, and 1st Belorussian Fronts. On 23 October 1943, it was awarded 'Guards' status and re-designated the 8th Guards Mechanied Corps. In 1944, it took part in the Zhitomir-Berdichev, Korsun-Shevchenkovsky, Proskurov-Chernovits, and Lvov-Sandomir battles, gaining the 'Carpathian' honorific in April 1944. It ended the war in Berlin after participating in the Warsaw-Poznan and East Pomeranian offensives. In June 1945, recognising its role in capturing Berlin, it was awarded the honorific 'Berlin'. As part of the occupation forces, it was assigned to the 1st Guards Tank Army (later 1st Guards Mechanised Army).

In the immediate post-war period, the Corps was reorganised as the 8th Guards Mechanised Division. In May 1957, it was reorganised as the 20th Guards Motor Rifle Division bearing honorifics: Carpathia-Berlin, Red Banner, Order of Suvorov. It was stationed at Grimma in eastern Germany. In 1964, the division was transferred to the 8th Guards Army. It took part in the 1968 invasion of Czechoslovakia as part of the 1st Guards Tank Army, although when it returned to East Germany, it reverted to the control of the 8th Guards Army. Became part of 1st Guards Tank Army in 1983, until 1993.

The division was withdrawn from Germany in June 1993, and moved to Volgograd in the North Caucasus Military District. There it was under the command of the reduced 8th Guards Army Corps, formerly the 8th Guards Army.

The division remained garrisoned in Volgograd, with parts of the division having taken part in the First and Second Chechen Wars. The division was engaged from December 1994 to February 1995 in the First Chechen War. On 31 December 1994, units of the division, together with the 131st Motor Rifle Brigade and the 81st Guards Motor Rifle Regiment entered Grozny. On 13 January 1995, elements of the division began storming the Council of Ministers building. On 16 January, the building of the Council of Ministers was completely taken. On 21 January 1995, the 33rd MRR participated in the seizure of the Press House. On 5 February, the division occupied the Minutka Square. On 11 February 1995, after taking the main militant strongholds in Grozny, the division was withdrawn from the fighting and began to transfer its units to Volgograd. At the end of February 1995, the division was completely withdrawn from Chechnya.

In 2009 the division was renamed the 20th Guards Motor Rifle Brigade.

1988 Order of Battle 
Order of Battle of the division in 1988:

 20th Guards Motor Rifle Division Headquarters, Grimma
 454th Independent Guards Communications Battalion, Grimma
 68th Independent Guards Reconnaissance and Electronic Warfare Battalion, Plauen
 1st Guards Tank Regiment, Glauchau
 20th Independent Tank Battalion, Pomßen
 29th Guards Lublin Red Banner Orders of the Suvorov and Kutuzov Motorised Rifle Regiment, Plauen
 67th Guards Yaroslavl Red Banner Orders of the Suvorov and Bogdan Khmelnitsky Motorised Rifle Regiment, Grimma
 242nd Guards Zaleschitsky Order of Lenin Red Banner Orders of Suvorov. Kutuzov and Bogdan Khmelnitsky Motorised Rifle Regiment, Wurzen
 576th Bobruisk Order of Lenin Red Banner Order of the Suvorov Motor Rifle Regiment, Glauchau (BTR-60)
 944th Guards Chernivtsi-Gnieznensky Red Banner Orders of the Suvorov and Bogdan Khmelnitsky Artillery Regiment, Leisnig
 358th Guards Carpathian-Gneznensky orders of Kutuzov. Bogdan Khmelnitsky and Red Star Anti-Aircraft Missile Regiment, Leisnig
 487th Separate Anti-Tank Battalion, Oshatts (MT-12)
 133rd Independent Guards Carpathian Red Banner Engineer-Sapper Battalion, Leipzig
 1124th Independent Material Supply Battalion, Grimma
 39th Independent Equipment Maintenance and Recovery Battalion, Leipzig
 347th Independent Medical Battalion, Grimma
 153rd Independent Chemical Defence Battalion, Grimma

Reformation: 2021 
As of 2021, the Brigade was reportedly upgrading to division-level strength once again. The Division was reportedly planned to re-equip with the T-90M main battle tank. The transformation was reported as likely to be complete in 2022 and was reported to incorporate the following reconstituted formations:

 33rd Motor Rifle Regiment (Kamyshin)
 255th Motor Rifle Regiment (Volgograd)
 944th Guards Self-Propelled Artillery Regiment
 358th Guards Anti-Aircraft Missile Regiment
 428th Separate Tank Battalion (near Volgograd)
 487th Separate Anti-Tank Artillery Battalion.

The division took part in the Russian invasion of Ukraine in the Kherson and Kyiv areas. In March, it was announced that the commander of the 33rd Motor Rifle Regiment, Lt. Colonel Yuri Agarkov, had been killed.

On the night of 9/10 July 2022, the division lost the following, and at least four other, more junior, officers, in a HIMARS attack.

 Commanding officer, Colonel Aleksey Gorobets
 Chief of staff and first deputy commander, Colonel Sergey Nikolaevich Kens
 Deputy commander, Colonel Kanat Mukatov
 Deputy commander for military-political work, Colonel Alexei Avramchenko
 Artillery chief, Colonel Nikolai Kornelyuk
 Head of the operational department of the headquarters, Lieutenant Colonel Koval
 Deputy head of logistics, Lieutenant Colonel Yevgeny Vyrodov
 Deputy Artillery chief Lieutenant Colonel Alexander Gordeev

Footnotes
By 25 June The remnants of 5th Tank Division has been driven into the Western Front's area of control, and a report by the front's General Staff said "the remains of Northwestern Front's 5th Tank Division are concentrated 5 kilometres south east of Molodechno; 3 Tanks, 12 Armoured Cars, and 40 trucks".

Notes

References
Keith E. Bonn, Slaughterhouse: the Handbook of the Eastern Front, Aberjona Press, Bedford, PA, 2005, p. 351
 David Glantz (1998), 'Stumbling Colossus – The Red Army on the Eve of World War', Kansas. 
 Steve Newton, Panzer Operations on the Eastern Front – The Memoirs of General Raus, 2003

Further reading 
 Brian Taylor, Barbarossa To Berlin A Chronology of the Campaigns on the Eastern Front 1941 to 1945, 2003, Spellmount Ltd, 
 David Glantz (2003), 'Before Stalingrad Barbarossa – Hitler's Invasion of Russia 1941', Tempus. 
 Christer Bergstrom, (2007) 'Barbarossa – The Air Battle: July–December 1941, Ian Allan Publishing.

020
Infantry divisions of Russia
Military units and formations established in 1957
Military units and formations disestablished in 2009
Military units and formations of the 2022 Russian invasion of Ukraine